The Allin Institute is a building in Bandon, County Cork, Ireland. Formerly known as the Bandon Society Rooms, it was renamed in honour of James Allin (1780–1866) following his death on 30 November 1866. James Allin had bequeathed the building to a group of trustees to be used as a community building for Protestant religious and other purposes. The property, which was originally three storeys, was burnt on the morning of 29 June 1921. The replacement two storey structure, which exists today, was designed by Irish architect William Henry Hill. It was rebuilt in an Arts and Crafts style during 1924, and opened on 29 June 1925.

References

Buildings and structures in County Cork
Bandon, County Cork